Mathieu Crépel (born 26 October 1984 in Tarbes, Hautes-Pyrénées) is a French professional snowboarder and World Champion based in Anglet, Northern Basque Country. Crépel rides regular stance. He has also surfed competitively in the multi-discipline Quik Cup.

Early life
Crépel began snowboarding at the age of six in the Pyrenean resort of La Mongie (Hautes-Pyrénées) on a customised board specially designed for a small child with ski bindings, soon earning the nickname 'Little Monkey' for his agility.  His family attended many major winter sports events due to his father's occupation as a ski instructor and consequently Crépel was present at the birth of snowboarding in France and the Pyrenees.

When he was 10 years old, Crépel was spotted by Terje Haakonsen whilst on a Quiksilver photoshoot in Greenland and invited to take part in the Arctic Challenge and by the age of 15 he had been runner up in the Youth World Championships. He went on to win the snowboarding title in the Quik Cup of 2001 and 2002, took third place in the 2001 Half Pipe Junior World Championships and second place in the 2003 Quiksilver Slopestyle Pro in 2003.

Senior snowboarding career
In 2005 Crépel won the Crystal Globe and was the first ever French winner of a half pipe world title.

In 2006 Crépel represented France at the Olympic Winter Games but failed to win a medal however later in the same year he became the first Ticket to Ride (TTR) World Snowboard Tour champion.

In 2007, Mathieu Crépel became world champion at both big air and the half pipe at the World Championships in Arosa, Switzerland. During the big air he became the first ever person to land a switch backside 12 in competition.

Mathieu Crépel Invitational
The Mathieu Crépel Invitational is a new annual event (inaugural meet February 2008) which will be held in the Ayré Forest in the Pyrenees and will form part of the TTR World Championship series. The event is notable for its unique format – each rider nominates two tricks and the set trick list is created by drawing five of the nominations at random.

Media and business ventures
Crépel has appeared in several snowboarding videos and is the subject of a book published in France by Editions Rival.

He also a supporter of the environmental organisations the Mountain Riders association  and the Surfrider Foundation

See also
 Snowboarding at the 2006 Winter Olympics – Men's halfpipe
 France at the 2006 Winter Olympics

References

External links
 Mathieu Crépel's  official website
 The official website of the MC Invitational
 Crépel winning the 2007 World Championships (photo number 5)
 Mathieu Crépel’s profile, on the Quiksilver website.
 Mathieu Crépel's profile on the X Games website
  Mathieu Crépel's interview on the website of the TTR Tour
 Mountain Riders Association
 Surfrider Foundation Europe

1984 births
Living people
Sportspeople from Tarbes
French male snowboarders
Snowboarders at the 2006 Winter Olympics
Snowboarders at the 2010 Winter Olympics
Olympic snowboarders of France
Université Savoie-Mont Blanc alumni
21st-century French people